Spaceland Presents – The Drones (In Spaceland • Nov. 15th, 2006), or Live in Spaceland, is the first live album by Australian alternative rockers, the Drones, which was released in February 2007 via the American label, Spaceland Recordings. Its ten tracks were recorded at Spaceland, an alternative rock/indie rock nightclub in the Silver Lake neighbourhood of Los Angeles, on 15 November 2006, as part of NMEs Wednesday night concert series. The band performed without a setlist.

Reception 

PopMatters gave the album a lukewarm review, calling it a "fairly unspectacular" effort that was "not recorded with the strongest material, or when the Drones are at their best", even calling it a "step back" from their "unhinged and visceral studio sound", despite being a "noble attempt".

Track listing
 "Sitting on the Edge of the Bed Cryin'"
 "She Had an Abortion that She Made Me Pay For"
 "This Time"
 "Sharkfin Blues"
 "I'm Here Now"
 "Six Ways to Sunday"
 "Dog Eared"
 "I Don't Never Wanna Change"
 "The Miller's Daughter"
 "The Downbound Train" (Chuck Berry)

Credits
Adapted from Discogs:
Artwork – Alexandra Lahr, Option-g
Bass Guitar – Fiona Kitschin
Drums – Michael Noga*
Guitar – Rui Pereira
Guitar, Vocals – Gareth Liddiard
Mastered By – Henrik Jacobsson
Mixed By, Producer – Ed Goodreau
Recorded By – Scott Cornish
Recorded By, Producer, Executive Producer – KamranV
Written-By – The Drones (tracks: 1 to 9)

References

The Drones (Australian band) albums
2007 live albums